The 2000–2001 Coca-Cola Champions Trophy was a triangular ODI cricket competition held in Sharjah, United Arab Emirates from 20 to 29 October 2000. It featured the national cricket teams of India, Sri Lanka and Zimbabwe. Its official sponsor was Coca-Cola. The tournament was won by Sri Lanka, who defeated India in the final.

Points table

Group stage

1st ODI

2nd ODI

3rd ODI

4th ODI

5th ODI

6th ODI

Final

References

2000 in Indian cricket
Cricket in the United Arab Emirates
2000 in Sri Lankan cricket
2000 in Zimbabwean cricket
One Day International cricket competitions
International cricket competitions from 1997–98 to 2000
2000 in Emirati cricket